Ian Thomas William Craney (born 21 July 1982) is an English former professional footballer who played as a midfielder. He was most recently a first-team coach at Ipswich Town.

He had five spells with Accrington Stanley during his career, the latest ending at the end of the 2011–12 season. He also played in the Football League with Swansea City, Huddersfield Town, Morecambe and Rochdale, as well as spells in non-League football with Altrincham and Fleetwood Town.

Club career
After starting his career as a junior at Everton, he got his first break in senior football at Conference National side Altrincham, before moving to Accrington Stanley in 2004. He then signed a permanent deal at Swansea City on 9 January 2007 for £150,000 from Accrington Stanley having been on loan since 23 November 2006. He returned to Accrington in early 2008, after an initial loan spell.

Fellow League Two side Morecambe saw two bids rejected for the midfielder in July 2008. But just two games into the 2008-09 season, Accrington accepted an undisclosed fee from League 1 side Huddersfield Town for the midfielder. He took up the vacant number 5 shirt following the sale of David Mirfin to Scunthorpe United. He made his Town debut in their 3–1 defeat by Milton Keynes Dons at the Galpharm Stadium on 23 August 2008. His first goal for the Terriers was the winning goal in their 2–1 win over Cheltenham Town at Whaddon Road on 6 September 2008.

Whilst playing for his previous club, Accrington Stanley, he was an England National Game XI international.

On 22 July 2009, Craney joined Football League Two side Morecambe on a season-long loan along with teammate Phil Jevons. He got his first goal for the Shrimps in their 5–2 defeat by Burton Albion on 15 August 2009. Injury cut short half of Craney's season, and he returned to the Galpharm on 20 April 2010. The following day, his contract at Huddersfield was terminated.

He joined Fleetwood Town for the 2010/11 season. On 25 November 2010 he rejoined former club Accrington Stanley for a third spell, on a short-term loan deal until the start of 2011. He returned to Fleetwood Town on 7 January as the clubs failed to agree an extension to his loan deal. On 31 January he rejoined Stanley on a permanent basis, for his third full-time spell with the club. He was released at the end of the 2011–12 season and in July 2012 he began training with Grimsby Town. In August 2012 he joined Rochdale but was released in January 2013 after making seven appearances in all competitions.

He then joined AFC Telford United on 5 February 2013 for the rest of the season. He was also the first signing under the new manager Mark Cooper. On 2 May 2013 he was released by the club.

On 31 May 2013 he joined Stockport County on a free transfer, but fell out of favour and joined Stafford Rangers for the remainder of the season on 17 January 2014.

At the expiry of his Stockport contract, Craney joined Conwy Borough of the Cymru Alliance league on 7 July 2014.

International career
Whilst playing for his previous club, Accrington Stanley, he was an England National Game XI international.

Coaching career
In May 2021, Craney joined Paul Cook's coaching staff at Ipswich Town as a first-team coach, having previously worked alongside Cook as a kitman while at Wigan Athletic. Craney left the club in December following the sacking of Cook as manager.

Honours
Accrington Stanley
Conference National: 2005–06

References

External links

1982 births
Living people
English footballers
Footballers from Liverpool
Association football midfielders
Altrincham F.C. players
Accrington Stanley F.C. players
Swansea City A.F.C. players
Huddersfield Town A.F.C. players
Morecambe F.C. players
Fleetwood Town F.C. players
Rochdale A.F.C. players
AFC Telford United players
Stockport County F.C. players
Stafford Rangers F.C. players
Conwy Borough F.C. players
National League (English football) players
English Football League players
England semi-pro international footballers
Wigan Athletic F.C. non-playing staff
Ipswich Town F.C. non-playing staff